This is a List of international river borders.  Rivers that form any portion of the border between two countries minimum:

By region

Africa

The following rivers form borders of countries in Africa:
 Akanyaru River: Rwanda and Burundi
 Akagera River: Rwanda and Tanzania
 Bahr al-Arab: Sudan and South Sudan
Caledon River: Lesotho and South Africa
 Chobe River: Namibia and Botswana
 Congo River: Democratic Republic of Congo and Republic of Congo
 Donga River: Nigeria and Cameroon
 Kagitumba river: Rwanda, Uganda and Tanzania
 Kasai River and Kwango River: Democratic Republic of Congo and Angola
 Kunene River: Namibia and Angola
 Limpopo River: South Africa and Botswana
 Limpopo River: South Africa and Zimbabwe
 Luapula River: Democratic Republic of Congo and Zambia
 Niger River: Benin and Niger
 Okavango River: Namibia and Angola
 Orange River: Namibia and South Africa
 Rusizi River: Burundi and Democratic Republic of the Congo
 Rusizi River: Rwanda and Democratic Republic of the Congo
 Senegal River: Senegal and Mauritania
 Ubangi River and Mbomou River: Central African Republic and Democratic Republic of the Congo
 White Nile: Sudan and South Sudan
 Yobe River: Niger and Nigeria
 Zambezi: Botswana and Zambia
 Zambezi: Namibia and Zambia
 Zambezi: Zimbabwe and Zambia

North America

US/Mexico

Rivers form a portion of the United States-Mexico border in the U.S. states of Arizona and Texas and the Mexican states of Baja California, Chihuahua, Coahuila, Nuevo León, and Tamaulipas.
Rio Grande: United States and Mexico
Colorado River (Arizona-Baja California): United States and Mexico

US/Canada 

Detroit River: United States and Canada
Halls Stream: United States and Canada
Monument Creek: United States and Canada
Niagara River: United States and Canada
Pine River: United States and Canada
Pigeon River: United States and Canada
Rainy River: United States and Canada
St. Clair River: United States and Canada
St. Croix River: United States and Canada
St. Francis River: United States and Canada
Saint John River: United States and Canada
St. Lawrence River: United States and Canada
St. Marys River: United States and Canada

Central America 

Hondo River (Belize): Mexico and Belize
Suchiate River: Mexico and Guatemala
Usumacinta River: Mexico and Guatemala
Coco River: Nicaragua and Honduras
Paz River: Guatemala and El Salvador
Motagua: Guatemala and Honduras
San Juan River: Nicaragua and Costa Rica
Sarstoon River: Guatemala and Belize
Sixaola River: Costa Rica and Panama
Sumpul River: El Salvador and Honduras
Guasaule River: Honduras and Nicaragua

Caribbean Region 
Artibonite River: Dominican Republic and Haiti

South America 

Rivers that form borders between countries in South America include:

Amazon River: Colombia, Peru and Brazil
Apaporis River: Colombia and Brazil
Arauca River: Colombia and Venezuela
Bermejo River: Argentina and Bolivia
Catatumbo River: Colombia and Venezuela
Courantyne River: Guyana and Suriname
Cuareim River: Brazil and Uruguay
Guaitara River: Colombia and Ecuador
Iguazu River: Argentina and Brazil
Maroni River: French Guiana and Suriname
Mataje River: Colombia and Ecuador
Meta River: Colombia and Venezuela
Mira River: Colombia and Ecuador
Negro River: Colombia and Venezuela
Oiapoque River: Brazil and French Guiana
Orinoco River: Colombia and Venezuela
Paraguay River: Argentina and Paraguay
Paraguay River: Brazil and Paraguay
Paraná River: Argentina and Paraguay
Paraná River: Brazil and Paraguay
Pilcomayo River: Argentina and Paraguay
Putumayo River: Colombia and Peru
Rapirrán River: Brazil and Bolivia
Rapirrán River: Brazil and Peru
Uruguay River: Argentina and Uruguay
Uruguay River: Brazil and Argentina
Vaupés River: Colombia and Brazil
Yaguaron River: Brazil and Uruguay
Zulia River: Colombia and Venezuela

Europe 

Rivers that form borders between countries in Europe include:
Águeda: Spain and Portugal
Ardila River: Spain and Portugal
Bidasoa: France and Spain
Blies: France and Germany
Bug River: Belarus and Poland, Ukraine and Poland
Caia: Spain and Portugal
Chanza River: Spain and Portugal
Danube: Germany and Austria nearby Passau, Austria and Slovakia, Croatia and Serbia, Hungary and Slovakia, Romania and Bulgaria, Romania and Ukraine, Serbia and Romania
Daugava River: Latvia and Belarus
Derkul: Ukraine and Russia
Dnieper: Belarus and Ukraine
Dniester: Ukraine and Moldova
Douro: Portugal and Spain
Drava: Croatia and Hungary
Drina: Bosnia and Herzegovina and Serbia
Elbe: Czech Republic and Germany
Flöha: Czech Republic and Germany
Foyle: Ireland and United Kingdom (Northern Ireland)
Guadiana: Portugal and Spain
Inn: Austria and Germany
Grense Jakobselv: Norway and Russia
Kirnitzsch: Czech Republic and Germany
Kolpa: Croatia and Slovenia
Lauter: Germany and France
Lusatian Neisse: Germany and Poland
Lys: Belgium and France
Malše: Austria and Czech Republic
Maritsa (Evros/Meriç): Greece and Turkey
Meuse: Belgium and The Netherlands
Minho: Portugal and Spain
Morava: Austria and Slovakia, Czech Republic and Slovakia 
Moselle: Germany and Luxembourg
Mura: Croatia and Slovenia
Narva: Estonia and Russia
Neman River: Russia (Kaliningrad Oblast) and Lithuania
Niers: Germany and The Netherlands
Oder: Germany and Poland
Paatsjoki (Pasvikelva): Norway and Russia
Prut: Romania and Moldova, Ukraine and Romania
Rezovo: Bulgaria and Turkey
Rhine: Germany and France, Germany and Switzerland, Germany and The Netherlands, Switzerland and Liechtenstein
Sava: Bosnia and Herzegovina and Croatia, Croatia and Serbia
Seversky Donets: Ukraine and Russia
Sozh: Belarus and Ukraine
Tana River (Norway): Finland and Norway
Termon:Ireland and United Kingdom
Thaya: Austria and Czech Republic
Tisza: Romania and Ukraine, Ukraine and Hungary
Torne: Sweden and Finland
Vadakste: Latvia and Lithuania
Wye: England and Wales

Asia

Rivers that form the borders between countries in Asia include:
Amur River: China and Russia
Ussuri River: China and Russia
Argun River: China and Russia
Granitnaya River: China and Russia
Brahmaputra River: India, Bangladesh and China
Chu River: Kazakhstan and Kyrgyzstan 
Fly River: Indonesia and Papua New Guinea
Ganges River: India and Bangladesh
Golok River: Malaysia and Thailand
Hirmand River: Iran and Afghanistan
Amu River: Uzbekistan and Afghanistan
Indus River : China, India and Pakistan
Kaladan River: India and Myanmar
Mahakali River: India and Nepal
Mechi River: Nepal and India
Mekong River: Myanmar and Laos
Mekong River: Laos and Thailand
Kraburi River: Myanmar and Thailand
Salween River: Myanmar and China
Salween River: Myanmar and Thailand
Naf River: Bangladesh and Myanmar
Pandaruan River: Malaysia and Brunei
Tumen River: North Korea, 
China, and Russia
Yalu River: North Korea and China
Beilun River: Vietnam and China

Middle East
Tigris River: Turkey Syria and Iraq
Euphrates River: Turkey Syria and Iraq
Akhurian River: Armenia and Turkey
Aras River: Nakhchivan (Azerbaijan), Turkey, Iran and Armenia 
Hezil Suyu: Iraq and Turkey
Jordan River: Israel and Jordan
Jordan River: Palestine and Jordan
Khabur (Tigris): Iraq and Turkey
Shatt al-Arab or Arvand rud: Iraq and Iran
Wadi al Batin: Iraq and Kuwait

Lists of rivers
Rivers